Industrial heritage refers to the physical remains of the history of technology and industry, such as manufacturing and mining sites, as well as power and transportation infrastructure. Another definition expands this scope so that the term also covers places used for social activities related to industry such as housing, museums, education or religious worship, among other structures with values from a variety of fields in order to highlight the interdisciplinary character of industrial heritage. It is also argued that it includes the so-called sociofacts or aspects of social and institutional organizations, and mentifacts that constitute the attitudinal characteristics and value systems industrial heritage sites.

The scientific study of industrial remains is called industrial archaeology. The industrial heritage of a region is an aspect of its cultural heritage. It also forms part of a location's identity as it serves as evidence of progress and landmark achievements. The international organization dedicated to the study and preservation of such is The International Committee for the Conservation of the Industrial Heritage, known as TICCIH. These initiatives are partly driven by an interest in innovation and ingenuity or efforts to compensate for irreparable loss.

See also
List of industrial archaeology topics
List of notable industrial heritage sites
Industrial archaeology

United Kingdom
Anson Engine Museum
Armley Mills Industrial Museum
Blaenavon Industrial Landscape (Big Pit National Coal Museum and Blaenavon Ironworks)
Bratch
Industrial archaeology of Dartmoor
Ironbridge Gorge Museum Trust
Prestongrange Industrial Heritage Museum, East Lothian, Scotland
Prickwillow Museum
Rhondda Heritage Park
Scottish Industrial Railway Centre
Stretham Old Engine

Europe
European Route of Industrial Heritage
The Industrial Heritage Trail, Ruhr, Germany
Ore Mountain Mining Region, Germany/Czech Republic
Pythagoras Mechanical Workshop Museum, Norrtälje, Sweden
Vizcaya Bridge, Biscay, Spain

Turkey

SantralIstanbul, Istanbul
Hasanpaşa Gasworks, Istanbul
Bomonti Beer Factory, Istanbul
Tersane Istanbul, Istanbul
Fişekhane, Istanbul

Other regions
Industrial heritage of Barbados
Melbourne Steam Traction Engine Club, Australia
Sloss Furnace, Birmingham, Alabama, USA
Soulé Steam Feed Works, USA
Asian Route of Industrial Heritage
The Modern Industrial Heritage Sites in Kyushu and Yamaguchi, Japan
The Tomioka Silk Mill and Related Industrial Heritage, Japan

References

Further reading
 Douet, J, (ed.). Industrial Heritage Re-tooled: The TICCIH guide to Industrial Heritage Conservation. Lancaster: Carnegie. 2012. pp. 244 
 Itzen, P., Müller, Chr. (eds), The Invention of Industrial Pasts: Heritage, political culture and economic debates in Great Britain and Germany, 1850-2010, Augsburg: Wissner. 2013. pp. 184 .
 Oevermann, H., Mieg, H. A. (eds). Industrial Heritage Sites in Transformation: Clash of Discourses. London, New York: Routledge. 2014. pp. 222 .
 Christian Wicke, Stefan Berger, and Jana Golombek (eds), Industrial Heritage and Regional Identities. London: Routledge. 2018. pp. 245.

External links

"Industrial Heritage in All Regions", a list of links to industrial heritage sites in Great Britain, at Aboutbritain.com
bih.ballarat.edu.au
archeologiaindustriale.net, Project for the Italian Industrial Heritage promotion.
Asturian industrial heritage

Heritage
Cultural heritage